Nantybwch railway station was a station on the London and North Western Railway's Heads of the Valleys line serving the village of Nantybwch in the Welsh county of Monmouthshire.

History
The line was leased and operated by the London and North Western Railway which acquired the smaller railway company on 30 June 1866. On 1 March 1864, the line was extended from Brynmawr to Nantybwch where a station was opened.

The station was reached by the  nine-arch Blaen-y-Cwm viaduct. It was situated to the north of the small settlement from which it took its name and to the north-west of the local school. Road access was via an unmade up lane reached by passing staff cottages adjacent to the line. Single-engine loads between Rhymney and Nantybwch were restricted to 12 loaded wagons only.

Four platform faces were provided: two platforms either side of a curving island platform, a bay platform for Sirhowy services and a platform for Merthyr services. The Merthyr platform was adjacent to the road entrance and the platform building incorporated a ticket office and porters' room. A weather-boarded footbridge linked the platforms which were lit by Sugg's Rochester pattern gaslights. On the island platform was No. 1 signal box which was completed in 1891 and remained in use until 1959. On the Up side was a water column fed from a brick-lined reservoir. Beyond the station to the west was No. 2 box which was stone-built and of Rhymney Railway design; it controlled the goods sidings adjacent to the double track which were used for stabling and running around stock after closure of the line to the west. Colliers' coaches were also stored here for the Sirhowy trains.

As a result of decline in the local industry and the costs of working the line between Abergavenny and Merthyr, passenger and goods services ceased on 4 January 1958. The last passenger service over the line was an SLS railtour on 5 January 1958 hauled by LNWR 0-8-0 49121 and LNWR 0-6-2 tank 58926. Final closure of Nantybwch came on 13 June 1960 with the withdrawal of the Sirhowy services,; the last timetable showing three trains on weekdays from Tredegar. The final day of operations was in fact the previous Saturday 11 June when GWR 5700 No. 3634 worked the last Up train from Tredegar at 4.32pm and the last Down at 4.50pm with No. 8711.

Present
The site of the station has been lost under the A465 road.

References

Notes

Sources

Disused railway stations in Blaenau Gwent
Former London and North Western Railway stations
Railway stations in Great Britain opened in 1864
Railway stations in Great Britain closed in 1960
1864 establishments in Wales
1960 disestablishments in Wales